The 2018 United States House of Representatives elections in Minnesota were held on November 6, 2018, to elect the eight U.S. representatives from the state of Minnesota, one from each of the state's eight congressional districts. The elections coincided with an open gubernatorial election, a U.S. Senate election, a special U.S. Senate election, State House elections, and other elections.

In the 2018 elections, Democrats gained the 2nd and 3rd districts from Republican incumbents, and the Republicans gained the 1st and 8th districts from Democrats running for higher office, leaving party representation in Minnesota's House delegation unchanged at five members from the DFL and three members from the GOP.

Overview

Results of the 2018 United States House of Representatives elections in Minnesota by district:

District 1

Minnesota's 1st Congressional District extends across southern Minnesota from the border with South Dakota to the border with Wisconsin. Democrat Tim Walz, who has represented the district since 2007, was re-elected with 50% of the vote in 2016. He did not run for re-election to the U.S. House in 2018, instead opting to run for Governor.

Republican Jim Hagedorn faced DFL candidate Dan Feehan in the general election. Minnesota's 1st congressional district was listed as one of the NRCC's initial targets in 2018.

Democratic primary

Candidates
Declared
Dan Feehan, army veteran and former Acting Assistant Secretary of Defense for Readiness
Colin "Coke" Minehart, restaurateur
Withdrawn
Vicki Jensen, former state senator (endorsed Feehan)
Joe Sullivan, clean energy advocate (endorsed Feehan)
Rich Wright, attorney (endorsed Feehan)

Endorsements

Primary results

Republican primary

Candidates
Declared
Andrew Candler
Jim Hagedorn, nominee for MN-01 in 2014 and 2016
Carla Nelson, Minnesota State Senator
Steve Williams

Endorsements

Primary results

General election

Debates
Complete video of debate, October 12, 2018

Polling

Results

District 2

Democrat Angie Craig defeated incumbent Republican Jason Lewis in a rematch of their 2016 race.

Democratic primary

Candidates
Declared
 Angie Craig, former St. Jude Medical executive and 2016 candidate for MN-2

Endorsements

Republican primary

Candidates
Declared
 Jason Lewis, incumbent U.S. Representative

Endorsements

General election

Debates
Complete video of debate, October 19, 2018

Polling

Results

District 3

Democrat Dean Phillips defeated incumbent Republican Erik Paulsen.

Democratic primary

Candidates
Declared
Dean Phillips, businessman
Cole Young

Primary results

Republican primary

Candidates
Declared
Erik Paulsen, incumbent U.S. Representative

Primary results

General election

Debates
Complete video of debate, October 19, 2018

Polling

Results

District 4

Democrat Betty McCollum, who has represented the district since 2001, was re-elected with 66% of the vote. She faced businessman Greg Ryan, the Republican nominee, and Third Party candidate Susan Pendergast Sindt of the Legal Marijuana Now Party in the general election.

Democratic primary

Candidates
Declared
 Muad Hassan
 Betty McCollum, incumbent U.S. Representative
 Reid Rossell

Primary results

Republican primary

Candidates
Declared
 Greg Ryan, Republican nominee for this seat in 2016

Primary results

Legal Marijuana Now

Candidates
Declared
 Susan Pendergast Sindt, LMN Nominee MN-04 in 2016

General election

Results

District 5

Democrat Keith Ellison, who has represented the district since 2007, was re-elected with 69% of the vote in 2016. Ellison decided to not run for reelection, instead seeking the Democratic nomination for the open Attorney General race.

Democratic primary

Candidates

Declared
 Jamal Abdi Abdulahi, engineer and chair of the DFL Somali-American Caucus
 Frank Nelson Drake, real estate agent, Republican nominee for this seat in 2016
 Margaret Anderson Kelliher, former Speaker of the Minnesota House of Representatives and candidate for governor in 2010
 Ilhan Omar, state representative
 Patricia Torres Ray, state senator
Campaign suspended, still on ballot
 Bobby Joe Champion, State Senator
Withdrew
 Keith Ellison, incumbent U.S. Representative, running for Attorney General in 2018
 Kim Ellison, Minneapolis School Board member, former spouse of Keith Ellison
 Julie Sabo, former state senator and daughter of former Congressman Martin Olav Sabo

Endorsements

Primary results

Republican primary

Candidates
 Bob Carney Jr., perennial candidate
Christopher Chamberlin
Jennifer Zielinski, health care worker and Republican activist

Primary results

General election

Results

District 6

Republican Tom Emmer, who has represented the district since 2015, was re-elected with 66% of the vote in 2016. Air Force veteran Ian Todd was the Democratic nominee.

Democratic primary

Candidates
Declared
 Ian Todd, military veteran

Primary results

Republican primary

Candidates
Declared
 Tom Emmer, incumbent U.S. Representative
 A.J. Kern
 Patrick Munro

Primary results

General election

Endorsements

Results

District 7 

Democrat Collin Peterson, who has represented the district since 1991, was re-elected with 52% of the vote in 2016.

Democratic primary

Candidates
Declared
 Collin Peterson, incumbent U.S. Representative

Primary results

Republican primary

Candidates
Declared
 Dave R. Hughes, Republican nominee in 2016
 Matt Prosch

Primary results

General election

Debates
Complete video of debate, October 19, 2018

Polling

Endorsements

Results

District 8

Democrat Rick Nolan, who has represented the district since 2013 and previously represented Minnesota's 6th district from 1975 to 1981, was re-elected with 50% of the vote in 2016. Instead of running for re-election, Nolan decided to retire. Republican St. Louis County Commissioner Pete Stauber defeated DFL nominee Joe Radinovich in the general election.

Democratic primary

Candidates
Declared
Kirsten Kennedy, Mayor of North Branch
Michelle D. Lee, former Duluth news anchor
Jason Metsa, Minnesota State Representative
Joe Radinovich, former Minnesota State Representative
Soren Christian Sorensen, liberal activist

Withdrew 
 Leah Phifer, former ICE agent and FBI analyst

Endorsements

Primary results

Republican primary

Candidates
Declared
Pete Stauber, St. Louis County commissioner
Harry Robb Welty, former Duluth School Board member

Declined
Stewart Mills III, Mills Fleet Farm executive and candidate for Congress in 2014 and 2016

Endorsements

Primary results

Independence

Candidates
Ray "Skip" Sandman

General election

Polling

Results

See also
 Minnesota elections, 2018

References

External links
Elections & Voting - Minnesota Secretary of State
Candidates at Vote Smart 
Candidates at Ballotpedia 
Campaign finance at FEC 
Campaign finance at OpenSecrets

Official campaign websites of District 1 candidates
Jim Hagedorn (R) for Congress
Dan Feehan (DFL) for Congress

Official campaign websites of District 2 candidates
Jason Lewis (R) for Congress
Angie Craig (DFL) for Congress

Official campaign websites of District 3 candidates
Erik Paulsen (R) for Congress
Dean Phillips (DFL) for Congress

Official campaign websites of District 4 candidates
Betty McCollum (DFL) for Congress
Greg Ryan (R) for Congress

Official campaign websites of District 5 candidates
Ilhan Omar (DFL) for Congress
Jennifer Zielinski (R) for Congress

Official campaign websites of District 6 candidates
Tom Emmer (R) for Congress
Ian Todd (DFL) for Congress

Official campaign websites of District 7 candidates
Dave Hughes (R) for Congress
Collin Peterson (DFL) for Congress

Official campaign websites of District 8 candidates
Joe Radinovich (DFL) for Congress
Pete Stauber (R) for Congress
Ray "Skip" Sandman (IP) for Congress

Minnesota
2018
2018 Minnesota elections